Bicyclus alboplaga is a butterfly in the family Nymphalidae. It is found in the Republic of the Congo, the Democratic Republic of the Congo, the Central African Republic and Uganda.

References

Elymniini
Butterflies described in 1914